Tetrarhanis ogojae, the Ogoja on-off, is a butterfly in the family Lycaenidae. It is found in Nigeria (south and the Cross River loop) and western Cameroon. The habitat consists of primary forests.

References

Butterflies described in 1961
Poritiinae